Edith Josephine Agnew (October 13, 1897 – February 20, 1988) was an American author of children's books, including Nezbah's Lamb, Sandy and Mr. Jalopy and others.

Early life 
Edith J. Agnew was born on October 13, 1897, in Denver, Colorado, the daughter of Ella Josephine Dunlap and Charles Clinton Agnew. She had a sister, Helen, and two brothers, Donald and Dwight. She lived in Mesa, Colorado and Delta, Colorado during her first years of life.

She became a teacher in Delta and later in Logan, Utah. After retiring from teaching, she began writing books.

Career 
Her first book was a collection of poems titled The Songs of Marcelino. She went on to write a few more children's books.

She died on February 20, 1988, in Santa Fe, New Mexico, at the age of 90, and was buried in Delta, Colorado.

Bibliography 
 My Alaska Picture Story Book (1948)
 Sandy and Mr Jalopy (1949)
 The Gray Eyes Family (1952)
 The Songs of Marcelino (1953)
 Leo of Alaska (1958)
 Nezbah's Lamb (1959)

References 

American writers
Children's writers
1897 births
1988 deaths